Mohammed Haruna (born 7 July 1988 in Accra) is a Ghanaian footballer. He last played as a defender for Accra Hearts of Oak SC.

Career
Before signing with Hearts on 11 April 2008, Haruna played for Manchester United Accra and Alshona FC in Qatar.

See also
Football in Ghana
List of football clubs in Ghana

References

Living people
Ghanaian footballers
Expatriate footballers in Qatar
Footballers from Accra
1988 births
Accra Hearts of Oak S.C. players
Association football defenders